KBRP-LP (96.1 FM, "Radio Free Bisbee") is a community-oriented radio station licensed to serve Bisbee, Arizona and all of Cochise County.  The station is owned by Bisbee Radio Project Inc. It airs a Variety format. The station derives some of its programming from Pacifica Radio.

The station was assigned the KBRP-LP call letters by the Federal Communications Commission on February 24, 2004.

KBRP-LP relies on donations by listeners, underwriters, and community events for financial support.

See also
 List of community radio stations in the United States

References

External links
 
 KBRP-LP service area per the FCC database

BRP-LP
BRP-LP
Radio stations established in 2004
Mass media in Cochise County, Arizona
Community radio stations in the United States